James Edward Banks (born July 16, 1979) is an American politician serving as the U.S. representative for  since 2017. A Republican, he previously served as a member of the Indiana Senate from 2010 to 2016.

On January 17, 2023, Banks announced his candidacy for the U.S. Senate seat being vacated by Mike Braun in 2024.

Early life and career

Banks was born in Columbia City, Indiana. He worked in the real estate and construction industry in Fort Wayne, Indiana, before serving in elected office. Banks serves in the United States Navy Reserve as a Supply Corps officer. From 2014 to 2015, he took a leave of absence from the Indiana State Senate to serve in Afghanistan.

From 2008 to 2010, Banks served on the Whitley County Council from the at-large district. He won the primary after defeating incumbent County Councilman Scott Darley. He was succeeded by Paula Reimers on the County Council. Banks also chaired the Whitley County Republican Party from 2007 to 2011. He was succeeded by Matt Boyd as chair. With assistance from the American Legislative Exchange Council, he has supported right-to-work legislation in Indiana. Banks addressed the 2014 Conservative Political Action Conference in 2014 after he was selected as one of their Top 10 Conservatives Under 40.

Banks was first elected to serve in the state senate for the 17th district in 2010, and upon military deployment to Afghanistan, he took a leave of absence from the state senate in September 2014. Invoking an Indiana state law that allows state and local officeholders to take leaves of absence during active duty military service, Banks was temporarily replaced by his wife, Amanda Banks, who held the office for the senate's 2015 legislative session. He returned to Indiana from overseas duty on April 14, 2015, and resumed his duties as state senator on May 8.

U.S. House of Representatives

Elections

2016 

On May 12, 2015, Banks announced his candidacy for Congress. The incumbent, Marlin Stutzman, announced he would not run for reelection and would instead campaign for the Republican nomination to succeed retiring Indiana Senator Dan Coats. The Club for Growth endorsed Banks.

Banks won the primary election, separating himself from five other like-minded conservative opponents, with 34% of the vote. Spending in the campaign exceeded $2 million as Banks raised $850,000 before the primary and the candidate who finished in second place, businessman Kip Tom, raised $950,000, including $150,000 he loaned from his personal funds.

2018 

Banks ran for reelection; he was unopposed in the Republican primary and defeated Democratic nominee Courtney Tritch in the general election with 64.7% of the vote.

2020 

Banks ran for a third term and defeated physician Chris Magiera in the Republican primary. He then defeated Democratic nominee Chip Coldiron in the general election with 67.8% of the vote.

Tenure

Banks was sworn in on January 3, 2017. He is a member of the Republican Study Committee.

In December 2017, Banks joined Representatives Ron DeSantis, Scott Perry, and Robert Pittenger in co-signing a letter to Secretary of State Rex Tillerson requesting that Tillerson release a classified counterterrorism agreement with Qatar.

In January 2020, Banks faced backlash after saying that remarks by Representative Ilhan Omar about her experiences with post-traumatic stress disorder were "offensive to our nation’s veterans." As a child, Omar fled civil war in Somalia and spent four years in a Kenyan refugee camp.

After Joe Biden won the 2020 election and Donald Trump refused to concede while making false claims of fraud, Banks was one of 126 Republican members of the House of Representatives to sign an amicus brief in support of a lawsuit filed at the United States Supreme Court contesting the results of the 2020 presidential election. The Supreme Court declined to hear the case. Banks later objected to the certification of the election results.

After the January 6, 2021, United States Capitol attack, Banks expressed support for a bipartisan commission to investigate the riot. He later changed his mind. On July 21, 2021, House Speaker Nancy Pelosi vetoed Kevin McCarthy's assigning of Banks and Jim Jordan to the January 6 Select Committee on the grounds that both had amplified Trump's false claims of fraud. Banks subsequently claimed that Pelosi was at fault for the January 6 insurrection and that she was using the commission to cover up her role.

In late February 2021, Banks and a dozen other Republican House members skipped votes and enlisted others to vote for them, citing the ongoing COVID-19 pandemic. He and the other members were actually attending the Conservative Political Action Conference, which was held at the same time as their slated absences. In response, the Campaign for Accountability, an ethics watchdog group, filed a complaint with the House Committee on Ethics and requested an investigation into Banks and the other lawmakers.

In October 2021, Representative Liz Cheney, vice chair of the January 6 Select Committee, revealed that Banks had been sending letters to federal agencies, claiming to be the ranking member of that committee, even though he had been rejected from it. In one September 2021 letter, Banks requested that the Department of the Interior provide him with information it had sent the committee. He also wrote, "Pelosi refused to allow me to fulfill my duties as Ranking Member", and signed the letter as "Ranking Member", which he was not.

Also in October 2021, when Rachel Levine, who is transgender, became an admiral in the United States Public Health Service Commissioned Corps, Banks commented in his official Twitter account: "The title of first female four-star officer gets taken by a man." Twitter, which prohibits "targeted misgendering or deadnaming of transgender individuals", censored his official account in response.

Committee assignments

Committee on Armed Services
Subcommittee on Intelligence, Emerging Threats and Capabilities
Subcommittee on Tactical Air and Land Forces
Committee on Education and Labor
Subcommittee on Health, Employment, Labor, and Pensions
Subcommittee on Higher Education and Workforce Investment
Committee on Veterans' Affairs
Subcommittee on Technology Modernization (Ranking Member)
Subcommittee on Economic Opportunity

Caucus memberships

 Congressional Western Caucus
 Congressional Pakistan Caucus
Republican Study Committee

Political positions

Student debt forgiveness
After the Biden administration announced a plan to forgive $10,000 in federal student debt along with other provisions, Banks tweeted his opposition, writing, "Student loan forgiveness undermines one of our military’s greatest recruitment tools at a time of dangerously low enlistments."

Health care 

Banks supported repealing and replacing the Affordable Care Act (Obamacare). He voted for the American Health Care Act of 2017 on May 4, 2017. He opposes single-payer healthcare, which he claims would cost taxpayers $32 trillion.

Economy 
In December 2017, Banks voted for the Tax Cuts and Jobs Act of 2017. Upon the passing of the bill, Banks said it was "a good day for the future of the American dream."

In 2020, Banks voted against the Families First Coronavirus Response Act. In 2021, he voted against COVID-19 economic stimulus a second time.

Environment 
In October 2016, Banks said, "I believe that climate change in this country is largely leftist propaganda to change the way Americans live and create more government obstruction and intrusion in our lives."

Abortion 

Banks opposes federal funding of abortions, as well as Planned Parenthood.

LGBT rights 

Banks opposes same-sex marriage.

Banks has called banning transgender people from serving in the military an "emotional issue." He opposes the military paying for sex reassignment surgery, saying, "I don't think taxpayers should be on the hook for that."

Big Tech 

In 2022, Banks was one of 39 Republicans to vote for the Merger Filing Fee Modernization Act of 2022, an antitrust package that would crack down on corporations for anti-competitive behavior.

2024 United States Senate election 
On January 17, 2023, Banks announced his candidacy for the United States Senate in 2024 in a tweet.

Personal life
Banks is Protestant and attends Trinity Evangelical Presbyterian Church.

References

External links

Congressman Jim Banks official U.S. House website
Jim Banks for Senate official campaign website
 
 
 

|-

|-

|-

1979 births
21st-century American politicians
United States Navy personnel of the War in Afghanistan (2001–2021)
American Protestants
Christians from Indiana
County commissioners in Indiana
Republican Party Indiana state senators
Indiana University Bloomington alumni
Living people
Military personnel from Indiana
People from Columbia City, Indiana
Protestants from Indiana
United States Navy reservists
Republican Party members of the United States House of Representatives from Indiana
Candidates in the 2024 United States Senate elections